WJAC may refer to:

WJAC-TV, an NBC–affiliated station located in Johnstown, Pennsylvania
The former call sign, or a derivative thereof the following stations:
WKGE, a radio station (850 AM) in Johnstown previously known as WJAC (AM)
WKYE, a radio station (96.5 FM) in Johnstown previously known as WJAC-FM
World Junior A Challenge, an international ice hockey tournament
Women's Junior Air Corps